Qasemabad (also Romanized as Qāsemābād) is a village in Vandadeh Rural District, Meymeh District, Shahin Shahr and Meymeh County, Isfahan Province, Iran. At the 2006 census, its population was 15, in 7 families.

References 

Populated places in Shahin Shahr and Meymeh County